Enakalle, or Enakalli, was the king of Umma circa 2500–2400 BC, a Sumerian city-state, during the Early Dynastic III period (2600–2350 BC). His reign lasted at least 8 years.

Enakalle in the cone of Entemena
His predecessor Ush, ruler of Umma, attacked nearby Lagash after ripping out the stele of Mesilim, trying to take Gu-Edin, as recording in the Cone of Entemena. Ush was severely defeated by Eannatum of Lagash, in a battle recorded in the Stele of the Vultures, losing 3,600 men in battle. Ush was then toppled and put to death by his own people.

Enakalle, his successor, finally made a peace treaty with Eannatum of Lagash, as described in the Cone of Entemena:

Enakalle in inscriptions
Ur-Lumma was the son of Enakalle, and his successor. He challenged Enannatum I, but was defeated by his successor Enmetena.

References

Sources 

 
 

Kings of Umma
25th-century BC Sumerian kings